Break Through is the third studio album by the Japanese rock duo B'z. The album sold 41,700 copies in its first week and sold a total of 724,640 copies.

Both Break Through and its follow-up, Risky, are considered the band's most synth-heavy albums.

"Lady-Go-Round" was the only song released as a single.

Track listing

Certifications

References 
 B'z albums at the official site

1990 albums
B'z albums
Japanese-language albums